South Padre Island is a resort town in Cameron County, Texas, United States. It is part of the Brownsville–Harlingen Metropolitan Statistical Area. The population was 2,066 at the 2020 census. The town is located on South Padre Island, a barrier island along the Texas Gulf Coast accessible via the Queen Isabella Causeway from the town of Port Isabel. South Padre Island is named after José Nicolás Ballí (Padre Ballí), a Catholic priest and settler.

Storm damage and structure issues

Storms 
 In September 1967, Hurricane Beulah caused extensive damage to much of the town of South Padre Island.
 On July 23, 2008, Hurricane Dolly made landfall on the island as a category 1 storm, also causing extensive damage to the town. The Bahia Mar Condominium had extensive damage and had to be gutted due to the damage.
 In September 2008 Hurricane Ike caused moderate damage to the island.
 In July 2010, the island received heavy rains from Hurricane Alex, but the storm left the island generally unscathed.

Ocean Tower demolition 
On December 13, 2009, an unfinished 31-story condominium, known locally as Ocean Tower, was brought down by a controlled implosion. Work had begun in 2006 but construction was halted in 2008 due to uneven settlement. As the problem could not be rectified, the incomplete reinforced concrete structure was demolished.

Industry
Subsequent to rebuilding from Hurricane Beulah, the island became a popular spring break destination for college students and a resort destination for families. Many multistory resort hotels and condominiums have been erected along the coastline of the Gulf of Mexico. The Schlitterbahn Beach Waterpark, the second of its kind in Texas, opened in South Padre Island in 2001.

Recreation

The year-round warm weather attracts tourists allowing them to experience the 34 miles of beach, 300+ days of sunshine, and all forms of entertainment from water sports to live music. With personal water craft rental, parasailing and dolphin watches being the most popular. Other favorites are horseback riding adventures on the beach and ecological tours that explore Laguna Madre Bay and Gulf of Mexico.

Fishing is also popular. Every year, the Texas International Fishing Tournament is held in late summer, with winnings totaling almost a quarter million dollars. Other fishing tournaments include the Ladies Kingfish Tournament, the Ron Hoover Tournament, just to name a few.

In March, the island is a popular spring break destination for college students. The rest of the year it is a popular family resort destination, with July being the most crowded.

In January 2011, the island hosted the NBA Development League Showcase at the South Padre Island Convention Centre.

On March 27, 2000, WCW Monday Nitro was held at the former Sheraton Hotel (Now Pearl) as part of their yearly Nitro Spring Break editions.

Good views of the nearby SpaceX South Texas launch site at Boca Chica has attracted hundreds of tourists.

Geography

Climate

South Padre Island experiences a warm humid subtropical climate (Köppen Cwa), transitioning into a hot semi-arid climate (BSh). Rainfall tends to be the highest during the summer and autumn months, usually ranging from 2 to 6 inches of rain each month. September has the highest rainfall, averaging 6.3 inches, followed by October, which averages 4 inches of rain. Due to the island being next to the ocean, temperatures above  are not common. South Padre Island went down to at least  during the 2021 Texas freeze.

Due to the fact that South Padre Island is surrounded by water, precipitation is a little higher than cities farther inland in the Rio Grande Valley. In March, the island is a popular resort area to many tourists. Tens of thousands of tourists come to the island to enjoy the warm temperatures South Padre Island offers. The island even ranked #1 in Best Spring Break Destinations by U.S. News & World Report

Demographics

2020 census

As of the 2020 United States census, there were 2,066 people, 1,477 households, and 892 families residing in the town.

2000 census
As of the census of 2000, there were 2,422 people, 1,222 households, and 662 families residing in the town. The population density was 1,335.9 people per square mile (516.7/km2). There were 4,685 housing units at an average density of 2,584.1 per square mile (999.4/km2). The racial makeup of the town was 94.59% White, 0.70% African American, 0.45% Native American, 0.21% Asian, 0.04% Pacific Islander, 2.77% from other races, and 1.24% from two or more races. 22.83% of the population is Hispanic or Latino of any race.

There were 1,211 households, out of which 15.4% had children under the age of 18 living with them, 47.2% were married couples living together, 4.2% had a female householder with no husband present, and 45.3% were non-families. 35.8% of all households were made up of individuals, and 7.8% had someone living alone who was 65 years of age or older. The average household size was 2.00 and the average family size was 2.54.

In the town, the population was spread out, with 12.9% under the age of 18, 6.2% from 18 to 24, 28.2% from 25 to 44, 34.2% from 45 to 64, and 18.4% who were 65 years of age or older. The median age was 47 years. For every 100 females, there were 113.8 males. For every 100 females age 18 and over, there were 115.9 males.

The median income for a household in the town was $45,417, and the median income for a family was $53,250. Males had a median income of $39,250 versus $30,028 for females. The per capita income for the town was $31,708. About 10.2% of families and 12.0% of the population were below the poverty line, including 11.1% of those under age 18 and 7.8% of those age 65 or over.

Education
Children living in South Padre Island are zoned to schools in Point Isabel Independent School District. Children go to Garriga Elementary School (prek-5th), Port Isabel Junior High School (6–8), and Port Isabel High School (9–12). All of the schools are in Port Isabel.

In addition, South Padre Island residents may apply to schools in the South Texas Independent School District.

All of Cameron County is in the service area of Texas Southmost College.

Government
The United States Postal Service operates the South Padre Island Post Office.

Coast Guard Station South Padre Island is a United States Coast Guard search and rescue station on South Padre Island.

Transportation
Brownsville/South Padre Island International Airport in Brownsville and Valley International Airport in Harlingen serve the island.

In popular culture
South Padre Island is mentioned by Mark Wahlberg's character Cade Yeager in Transformers: Age of Extinction when he is seen first meeting up with his best friend/business partner Lucas (T. J. Miller).

South Padre Island is the main setting of Season 4 Episode 20 "Conflicted" of Criminal Minds.

Loose interpretations of South Padre Island and neighboring Port Isabel appear in the racing video game The Crew.

South Padre Island is home to The MBM-McCarter Families Inc. and headquarters to MBM Corporative Inc. since May 2000, where the family has played a big role on the community.

Escape from Octopus Shores was filmed June to August 2005 and released on December 7, 2005.

South Padre Island was filmed in The Bad Boys Club.

Gallery

See also 

 Queen Isabella Causeway

References

External links

 City of South Padre Island official website
 Convention and Visitors Bureau
 Chamber of Commerce
 Destination South Padre Island

Towns in Cameron County, Texas
Towns in Texas
Beaches of Texas
Populated coastal places in Texas
Landforms of Cameron County, Texas